The following is a list of P. Ramlee films, in alphabetical order; it is also sortable by other criteria. Also indicated is whether P. Ramlee acted in, directed, wrote, or composed (or arranged) music for each film.

Film

Television

References

Malaysian filmographies
Ramlee, P.
Ramlee, P.